Welbore Ellis may refer to:

 Welbore Ellis (bishop) (1651–1734), English bishop of Kildare and of Meath and Irish privy councillor
 Welbore Ellis, 1st Baron Mendip (1713–1802), British statesman, son of the bishop

See also
Welbore Ellis Doyle
Welbore Ellis Agar (nephew of first Baron Mendip) 
Welbore Ellis Agar, 2nd Earl of Normanton